Jens Sørensen (4 April 1941 – 21 November 2020) was a Danish cyclist. He competed in the team pursuit at the 1960 Summer Olympics.

References

External links
 

1941 births
2020 deaths
Danish male cyclists
Olympic cyclists of Denmark
Cyclists at the 1960 Summer Olympics
Cyclists from Copenhagen